Seagraves High School is a public high school located in Seagraves, Texas, United States and classified as a 2A school by the UIL. It is part of the Seagraves Independent School District located in north central Gaines County. In 2015, the school was rated "Met Standard" by the Texas Education Agency.

Athletics
The Seagraves Eagles compete in these sports - 

Baseball
Basketball
Cross Country
Football
Golf
Powerlifting
Softball
Tennis
Track and Field

State Titles
Girls' Basketball - 
2005(1A/D1)^

^Also won Texas Cup.

State Finalist
Football - 
1977(1A)

Theater
One Act Play 
1990(2A), 1992(2A)

References

External links
Seagraves ISD

Schools in Gaines County, Texas
Public high schools in Texas